The 6th Ring Road is an expressway ring road in Beijing, China which runs around the city approximately  from the center of the city.

The road is numbered G4501 and as such is considered a peripheral segment of the G45 Daqing-Guangzhou Expressway. The Sixth Ring Road was opened for regular traffic on 12 September 2009.

Route
The 6th Ring Road runs within the confines of the municipality of Beijing. It is one of the most circular routes but still remarkably rectangular.
Basic Route: Liuyuan Bridge - Liqiaozhen - Sanhui Bridge - Zhangjiawan - Majuqiao - Huangcun - Liangxiang - Mentougou - Zhaikou/Wenquan - Xishatun - Gaoliying - Huosiying - Liuyuan Bridge

It is on the outer fringes of Beijing, and even beyond Beijing Capital International Airport. The expressway ring road is the only one to link with the equally remote Tongyan Expressway.

History
As early as 2000 or 2001, the southeastern stretch from Sanhui Bridge (interchange with the Jingha Expressway) through to Majuqiao (interchange with the Jingjintang Expressway) was put into operation. The route was first referred to as the projected 2nd Expressway Ring Road, much like the 5th Ring Road was once referred to as the 1st Expressway Ring Road; however, that name was abandoned in favour of the present-day 6th Ring Road.

By 2002, a road section starting in Xishatun (interchange with the Badaling Expressway) through to Sanhui Bridge, as well as a stretch from Majuqiao through to Huangcun/Shuangyuan Bridge (interchange with the Jingkai Expressway), were complete and opened to the general public.

Another 43 km of the expressway ring road opened behind schedule (the portion linking it up with the Jingshi Expressway and ultimately ending in Liangxiang in December 2004 and the section from the Badaling Expressway to Wenquan/Zhaikou in Mentougou in early January 2005). They were slated for a November 2004 opening. In the first case, the expressway was opened on December 20, 2004, at 14:00 local time, with over a month's delay. The entire road was opened in 2010.

Road conditions

Speed limit
The minimum speed limit of 50 km/h, maximum 100 km/h, throughout. Potential speed checks at Zhangjiawan and 500 metres to the east of Yongdingmen/Langfang exit; otherwise, none. It is not rare for passenger cars to zip well in excess of that speed limit, while to see lorries underperform in speed.

Southwestern 6th Ring Road: carriageway-separated; note: there are no "overtaking lanes" on this part of the ring road; left lane, maximum speed limit 100 km/h, minimum 80 km/h, designated "car only"; right lane, maximum speed limit 100 km/h, minimum 60 km/h, designated "carriageway".

Tolls
CNY 0.5/km, minimum charge of CNY 5, based on price for a small passenger vehicle. There have been (a few) calls to eradicate all toll gates within the confines of, and including, the 6th Ring Road. However, little to no action has been taken on this matter.
The 6th Ring Road is linked with Jingshi, Jingcheng, and Jingkai Expressways toll systems.

Lanes
4 lanes (2 in each direction) throughout.

Surface conditions
Generally excellent.

Traffic conditions
The traffic is usually very smooth; however, on weekends, tourists flock to suburban districts causing occasional traffic jams. The exit at Baige Bridge is also usually jammed due to heavy police presence at the exit. Car crashes also cause rare traffic jams.

Major exits
Xishatun, Gaoliying, Sanhui Bridge, Zhangjiawan, Majuqiao, Huangcun/Shuanghui Bridge, Liuyuan Bridge

Service areas
None; Beihuofa Service Area is projected (E. 6th Ring Road), as is a gas station on the Southwestern 6th Ring Road

Connections
 S32 Jingping Expressway: Liqiaozhen.
 China National Highway 102 (Tongyan Expressway): Sanhui Bridge.
 G1 Beijing–Harbin Expressway: Zhangjiawan.
 Jingjintang Expressway: Majuqiao.
 G45 Daqing–Guangzhou Expressway: Huangcun, Shuangyuan Bridge, Gaoliying.
 G4 Beijing–Hong Kong and Macau Expressway: Liyuan Bridge.
 Badaling Expressway: Xishatun.

Vast distances 
At a distance of 20 kilometres from the centre of town, the expressway covers a much larger distance than the inner ring roads. Equally large is the distance between two points.

For example, the distance between Jingtong Expressway to Jingshen Expressway is approximately 2 kilometres on the 4th Ring Road. It expands to nearly 4 kilometres on the 5th Ring Road. On the 6th Ring Road, 10 kilometres elapse from one expressway to the other—and the Jingtong to Jingshen Expressway (on the 6th Ring Road, the Jingha to Jingshen Expressway) is one of the shortest distances between expressways in Beijing.

Anything up to 30 - 35 kilometres can lapse between the Jingcheng Expressway and the Jingha Expressway.

For most people, travel on the 6th Ring Road is extremely rare. Although, strictly speaking, it is still on the perimeters of city limits, this is one massive ring road for a motorist to travel around.

List of exits

Symbols: ↗ = exit (↩ = exit present only heading clockwise, ↪ = anticlockwise); ✕ = closed exit; ⇆ = main interchange; ¥ = central toll gate; S = service area;
Listed are exits heading clockwise from northwestern starting point at Xishatuan

Northern 6th Ring Road
 ✕ Road further west (NW) blocked by portion under construction
 ⇆ 46: (Interchange with Badaling Expressway) Qinghe, Changping
 ✕ 47: Beijing Higher Education Park
 ↗ 49: Baishan, Shahe
 ↗ 51: Beiyuan, Xiaotangshan, Mafang
 ⇆ 52: (Interchange with Jingcheng Expressway) Miyun, Laiguangying
 ↗ 53: Huoshenying, Sishang

Eastern 6th Ring Road
 ⇆ 1: (Interchange with China National Highway 101) Jingmi Road
 ↗ 3: Nanfaxin, Shunyi
 ↗ 4: Shunyi South Ring Road
 ↗ 6: Liqiaozhen
 ↗ 7: (↪)
 ↗ 8: Tuanli
 ⇆ 9: (Interchange with Jingha Expressway) Harbin, Beijing
 ↗ 10:
 ↗ 11: Tianjin, Tongzhou
 ↗ 12: (↪) Tianjin
 ⇆ 13: (Interchange with Jingshen Expressway) Shenyang, Beijing
 ↗ 14: Ciqu, Shibalidian
 ⇆ 15: (Interchange with Jingjintang Expressway) Jingjintang Expressway, Majuqiao

Southern 6th Ring Road
 ↗ 18: Langfang, Yongdingmen
 ↗ 19: (↩) Weishanzhuang
 ⇆ 20: (Interchange with Jingkai Expressway) Jingkai Expressway
 ↗ 23: Huangcun
 ↗ 24: Beizangcun, Lucheng
 ✕ Gas station—under projection
 ↗ 26: Yaoshang, Changyang
 ↗ 27: Liangxiang, Guandao
 ⇆ 29: (Interchange with Jingshi Expressway)

Western 6th Ring Road
 ↗ 31: Yanshan, Liangxiang
 ✕ Remainder of Western 6th Ring Road is under projection

References

Road transport in Beijing
Ring roads in China
Expressways in China